Tal Burstein (born February 19, 1980) is an Israeli professional basketball coach and a former professional basketball player.

He played at the point guard position, and also as a swingman. He is 198 cm (6 ft 6 in) in height. He has also been named as one of the best Israeli basketball players ever.

Early life
Burstein is Jewish, and was born in Petah Tikva, Israel.

Professional career
Tal Burstein began his basketball career with the Bnei-Herzliya junior team. In the 1997–98 season, he made his professional debut and he was named the Israeli League Rookie of the Year. He became a team captain during the 1999–2000 season. In the 2001–02 season, he led the Israeli League in three-point field goal percentage, shooting 49.4%.

Beginning in the 2000–01 season, he played with Maccabi Tel Aviv. He became a starter in his first season in Tel Aviv. With the club, Burstein won 8 Israeli National Championships and 6 Israeli State Cups. He also won 3 European championships with Maccabi, the 2001 FIBA SuproLeague championship, and the EuroLeague championships in the years 2004 and 2005. After the 2008–09 season, Burstein left Maccabi Tel Aviv and signed with the Spanish team Fuenlabrada. A year later, Burstein returned to Maccabi, on a three-year contract.

In August 2012, he announced his retirement from playing professional basketball, after learning that he would have to undergo surgery on his injured hip, which would cause him to miss the entire upcoming season.

National team career
Burstein has played for all of the Israeli junior national teams and also for the senior men's Israeli national basketball team. In August 2000, he was the captain of the Israeli under-20 national team, which won a silver medal at the FIBA Europe Under-20 Championship in Ohrid, Macedonia. In August 2001, Burstein was a member of the Israeli Under-22 national team at the FIBA Under-21 World Championship in Saitama, Japan, where his team finished in 7th place.

He also played with the senior men's team, the Israeli national basketball team at the EuroBasket 2003, in Sweden, where his team finished in 7th place, and at the EuroBasket 2005. Burstein eventually also became the team captain on Israel's senior national team. During his time as a member of Israel's senior national team, he played as the national team's first shooting guard, and he could also play on the team as a point guard, if needed.

Coaching career
On June 29, 2017, Burstein returned to Maccabi Tel Aviv, as an assistant basketball coach.

References

External links
Euroleague.net Profile
Basketball / Rejuvenated Veteran Guard Tal Burstein Takes Over the Reins of the National Team

1980 births
Living people
Israeli Jews
Israeli men's basketball players
Israeli Basketball Premier League players
Bnei Hertzeliya basketball players
Maccabi Tel Aviv B.C. players
Baloncesto Fuenlabrada players
ABA League players
Israeli expatriate sportspeople in Spain
Israeli basketball coaches
Jewish men's basketball players
Liga ACB players
Sportspeople from Petah Tikva
Point guards
Shooting guards